Clanga is a genus which contains the spotted eagles. The genus name is from Ancient Greek klangos, "eagle".

Species

Notes

References

 
Bird genera
Birds of prey of Eurasia